Red Iron Lake is a natural lake group in Marshall County, South Dakota, in the United States. It consists of North Red Iron Lake and South Red Iron Lake.

Red Iron Lake has the name of a Native American chieftain.

See also
List of lakes in South Dakota

References

Lakes of South Dakota
Lakes of Marshall County, South Dakota